Fjoralb Deliaj (born 4 April 1997) is an Albanian professional footballer who plays as a midfielder for FC Struga in the Macedonian First Football League.

Club career
Deliaj was promoted to Flamurtari Vlorë senior squad during 2014–15 season where he made only one cup appearance, playing the second half of the second round match against Veleçiku Koplik on 5 November 2014.

The following season he joined Tirana as a free agent, making his first Albanian Superliga appearance on 13 March 2016 in the Albania derby against Vllaznia Shkodër which was lost 3–1. One month later, he agreed a contract extension, signing until June 2019. Deliaj finished his first Tirana season by making 11 league appearances, as Tirana finished 5th in championship.

In July 2016, Deliaj suffered a knee injury which kept him sidelined for the next three weeks. He missed the start of championship. During the 2016–17 season, his minutes were reduced, as he played 7 league matches and 5 cup matches, as Tirana was relegated for the first time in history and won Albanian Cup for the 16th time, setting a new record. It was also Deliaj's first career silverware.

In July 2017, Deliaj made his European debut by playing in the two-legged match against Hapoel Tel Aviv, collecting 49 minutes from 2 appearances as substitute as Tirana was eliminated from 2017–18 UEFA Europa League first qualifying round 0–5 on aggregate.  He left the club on 25 August 2017 after being told by manager Zé Maria that he was not in his plans.

On 7 September 2017, Deliaj returned to his boyhood club Flamurtari Vlorë. He scored his first Flamurtari goal on 27 September in the returning leg of 2017–18 Albanian Cup first round against Dinamo Tirana as the team progressed 6–1 on aggregate. He made his first Albanian Superliga appearance for Flamurtari on 22 December 2017 by playing in the last 11 minutes of a 0–3 win at Kamza in the matchday 16.

Style of play
Naturally a midfielder, Deliaj can also be deployed as defender.

Career statistics

Honours
Tirana
 Albanian Cup: 2016–17

References

External links
AFA profile

1997 births
Living people
Footballers from Vlorë
Albanian footballers
Albanian expatriate footballers
Association football midfielders
KF Tirana players
Flamurtari Vlorë players
FC Struga players
Kategoria Superiore players
Kategoria e Dytë players
Macedonian First Football League players
Albanian expatriate sportspeople in North Macedonia
Expatriate footballers in North Macedonia